{{DISPLAYTITLE:C16H21ClN4}}
The molecular formula C16H21ClN4 (molar mass: 304.82 g/mol, exact mass: 304.1455 u) may refer to:

 Enpiprazole
 Mepiprazole (Psigodal)

Molecular formulas